Kapp Heights is a census-designated place located in Point Township, Northumberland County in the state of Pennsylvania.  The community is located very close to the borough of Northumberland along Pennsylvania Route 147, near the confluence of the West Branch Susquehanna River and Susquehanna Rivers.  As of the 2010 census the population was 863 residents.

Demographics

References

Census-designated places in Northumberland County, Pennsylvania
Census-designated places in Pennsylvania